Carorita is a genus of dwarf spiders that was first described by E. Duffey & P. Merrett in 1963.  it contains only two species: C. limnaea and C. sibirica.

See also
 List of Linyphiidae species

References

Araneomorphae genera
Holarctic spiders
Linyphiidae
Spiders of Russia